The Mississippi Business Journal is a statewide weekly business newspaper, located in Jackson, Mississippi.

Each issue contains news coverage relating to the Mississippi business world along with regular opinion and freelance columns. Issues are sold statewide and feature a special list that accompanies that week's editorial focus, issues ranging from health care and economic development to banking and law.

Other editorial products include, the annual Book of Lists, Mississippi 100 private companies list, and NEXT! A Guide to Life After High School. Pulse, an issue focusing on health and wellness in Mississippi, was launched in 2010.

The journal hosts the annual Mississippi Business & Technology EXPO in Jackson. It also holds numerous awards programs honoring the state's business and tech community, such as the "Top in Tech" list.

Early history 
The newspaper was established by Joe Dove, former business editor of The Clarion-Ledger. He led the newspaper until 1984 when he sold it to Richard Roper, head of Downhome Publications and publisher of the Mississippi Magazine. Two years later, Roper sold the publication to Rosa Lee Harden Jones, who along with her husband Kevin, managed the paper for nearly a decade. Buddy Bynum and Joe Jones, were hired as publisher and editor in 1995.

2007-present 
Minnesota-based the Dolan Co., purchased the paper in 2007 as part of its New Orleans Publishing Group. In 2008, Ross Reily, former managing editor for the Delta Democrat Times in Greenville, was named editor and the following year Dolan veteran Alan Turner was named publisher.

In 2010, the journal relaunched its official website including a new Internet video channel and numerous social media platforms.

Ownership changed back to a Mississippi company in August 2012 after the newspaper was sold by Dolan to Journal Inc., parent company of the Northeast Mississippi Daily Journal in Tupelo, Mississippi.

References

External links

Newspapers published in Mississippi
Business newspapers published in the United States
Mass media in Jackson, Mississippi
Mass media companies established in 1979